Jerzy Zdzisław Osiński (born 7 July 1936) is a Polish politician, doctor of agricultural sciences (1974), deputy minister of agriculture (1980–1981), member of Sejm (Polish parliament) of 10th convocation (1989–1991).

Awards
1985: Officer's Cross of the Order of Polonia Restituta
1979: Gold Cross of Merit

References

1936 births
Living people
United People's Party (Poland) politicians
Polish People's Party politicians
Members of the Contract Sejm
Recipients of the Order of Polonia Restituta

University of Warmia and Mazury in Olsztyn alumni